John Arthur Jones (26 May 1856 – 20 January 1919) was a Welsh international rugby union forward who played club rugby for Cardiff Rugby Football Club and international rugby for Wales. He was awarded a single cap for Wales.

Personal life
Educated in Monmouth School, Jones became an Admiralty agent before becoming a colliery director. Jones began what was to become a long-standing tradition between Welsh rugby and the coal mines, and was the first colliery employee to represent Wales, a list that would run to over a hundred members. Jones would spend his later life undertaking various duties, including serving as High Sheriff of Glamorgan for 1918 and later governor of the University of South Wales and Monmouthshire.

Rugby career 
Jones came to prominence as a rugby player while representing Cardiff. Jones was a founding member of the Cardiff club in 1876. In 1877, while only 20 years old, he became secretary of Cardiff RFC and was a member of the committee after that.

in 1883 Jones was selected to represent Wales as part of the Home Nations Championship. In the first encounter between Scotland and Wales, Jones was part of a ten-man pack, the only time Wales had used such a heavy forwards tactic. Under the captaincy of Charlie Lewis, Jones was one of three new caps for Wales, the others being Newport's Horace Lyne and Dr. John Griffin, a stand-in from Edinburgh University. Wales lost the game by three goals to one, and the next match saw Wales switch back to nine forwards and Jones was never selected for the national team again.

International matches played
Wales
  1883

Bibliography

References 

1856 births
1919 deaths
Cardiff RFC players
High Sheriffs of Glamorgan
Rugby union forwards
Rugby union players from Risca
Wales international rugby union players
Welsh rugby union players